Jason Snell may refer to:

 Jason Snell (footballer) (born 1977), Australian rules footballer
 Jason Snell (visual effects artist), American special effects supervisor
 Jason Snell (writer) (born 1970), American writer and podcaster